RC National University of Uzbekistan is a Uzbekistani rugby club in Tashkent.

References

Uzbekistani rugby union teams
Sport in Tashkent